Piedrahita (meaning: standing stone) may refer to:

Places
 Piedrahíta, a municipality in the province of Ávila, Spain
 Piedrahíta, Santoña, a village in Santoña municipality, Cantabria, Spain
 Piedrahita de Castro, a municipality in the province of Zamora, Spain
 Piedrahita de Muñó, a town in the province of Burgos, Spain
 Piedrahita Mountains, a mountain range in the province of Ávila, Spain
 site of the Battle of Atapuerca

People
 Piedrahita (surname)